James Mark Bradfield (30 July 1933 – 19 November 1989) was an Australian politician. Born in Sydney, he was a company manager and underwent military service in 1951. In 1975, he was elected to the Australian House of Representatives as the Liberal member for Barton, and held the seat throughout the length of the Fraser government. He was defeated in 1983 by Gary Punch, and was unsuccessful in an attempt to regain the seat in 1984. He died in 1989.

References

Liberal Party of Australia members of the Parliament of Australia
Members of the Australian House of Representatives for Barton
Members of the Australian House of Representatives
1933 births
1989 deaths
20th-century Australian politicians